The following is a list of starting quarterbacks for the BC Lions of the Canadian Football League that have started a regular season game for the team. This list does not include preseason nor postseason appearances. They are listed in order of most appearances at quarterback for the Lions.

Regular season

The number of games they started during the season is listed to the right:

 * - Indicates that the number of starts is not known for that year for each quarterback

References
 BC Lions Football Club 2010 Game Notes
 BC Lions Game Notes
 Stats Crew

BC Lions
Starting quarterbacks